John Augustus Walker (1901–1967) was a well-known Alabama Gulf Coast artist of the Depression era who was commissioned to undertake several art projects for the Works Progress Administration.

Early life
Born in Mobile, Alabama, Walker was first encouraged to become an artist by an elementary school teacher, Mayme Simpson.

Forced at an early age to become the family breadwinner, Walker worked from 1 p.m. to 1 a.m. daily for the Mobile & Ohio Freight Department, limiting his sleep so that he could devote more waking hours to the study of drawing and painting.

He began his studies under Edmund C. DeCelle (misspelled in his letter as Cecile) of Mobile.

The St. Louis School of Fine Arts
A company-ordered transfer to St. Louis proved fortuitous for Walker, enabling him to enroll in the St. Louis School of Fine Arts, where he studied under the direction of Victor Holm, Edmund H. Wuerpel and Fred Green Carpenter.  After six years of study, he spent several years studying art in museums in New York and Chicago.   Walker also was deeply influenced by the famed Welsh painter, illustrator and muralist Frank Brangwyn.

According to a biography submitted to the University of Alabama in 1935, Walker exhibited his work at the fourteenth annual St. Louis Artists Guild Exhibition in 1926, followed by a "two-man" exhibition in Mobile in 1929 and a "one-man" exhibition at the Woman's Club in Mobile in 1933.  Both Mobile exhibitions were sponsored by Allied Arts Guild of Mobile.  The Woman's Club exhibition earned the following positive review in the Mobile Press-Register:The water colors of John Augustus Walker on exhibition at the Woman's Club House are among the most beautiful ever seen in Mobile.  Exquisitely delicate in handling and coloring, they are an outpouring of the sensitivity and poetic spirit in which John Walker reacts to a beauty which is everywhere – a beauty from which so many now choose to turn away, seeking instead a sordid viewpoint.  After all, it is with the spirit with which one sees – and in these water colors John Walker translates transcendent beauty.

Works
Walker is remembered as an unusually tireless artist who labored long hours in his North Royal Street studio in Mobile.  His paintings reflect a passion for bright colors, which he acquired from trips to Cuba and Key West — a passion reinforced by subsequent trips throughout the United States and Gulf Coast region.

Heavy dark outlines and painterly brushwork characterized both his commercial and public works.  Walker's preferred subject matter ranged from Mardi Gras, fantasy and  historical themes to landscapes and portraiture.

Walker's watercolors are still prized throughout the Alabama Gulf Coast region.  His paintings are displayed in many homes throughout the St. Louis area and throughout Alabama.  Along the Gulf Coast, he is especially remembered for his murals in the old City Hall building in Mobile (now the History Museum of Mobile), for the Smith Bakery murals on Dauphin Street in Mobile (now lost) and for his mural designs for the Federal Building Courtroom.  Walker paintings also are displayed in numerous public schools throughout the state.

Walker also earned an enduring reputation as a designer of floats, stage sets, and costumes for Mardi Gras.  Many of the float designs, noted for their exquisite artwork, are still displayed in museums.

Many of his works earned numerous local, state and national awards.  He was a founder and original member of the Mobile Art Guild, which he also served as an instructor.

Historical Panorama of Alabama Agriculture

One of the products for which Walker is most distinguished is the Historical Panorama of Alabama Agriculture, funded by the Works Progress Administration and commissioned by the Alabama Extension Service (now Alabama Cooperative Extension System) for exhibition at the 1939 Alabama State Fair.  Walker originally was contracted to paint 29 murals, although severe time constraints limited him to only ten.  Assuming that the paintings would be only temporary, Walker used tempera water-color paints rather than costlier, more durable oils — his preferred medium.

Following exhibition at the Alabama State Fair, the paintings were shipped to Shreveport for display at the 1939 Louisiana State Fair.  Afterward, they were shipped to the Alabama Polytechnic Institute (now Auburn University) in Auburn and stored in the Duncan Hall attic for almost a half century before they were rediscovered in the 1980s and refurbished.

Although these murals were designed to be only temporary, they are among the Alabama Cooperative Extension System's most valued historical artifacts and are considered prime examples of WPA-related art associated with the Great Depression era.

Notes

1901 births
1967 deaths
People from Mobile, Alabama
Auburn University people
Alabama Cooperative Extension System
American muralists
Federal Art Project artists